Sergey Gennadyevich Kuznetsov (born 7 May 1986) is a former Russian football player.

Club career
He made his debut in the Russian Premier League in 2005 for FC Dynamo Moscow.

External links
 
  Profile on the FC Rostov site

1986 births
Sportspeople from Oryol
Living people
Russian footballers
Russia under-21 international footballers
Association football midfielders
FC Dynamo Moscow players
FC Rostov players
FC Luch Vladivostok players
PFC Krylia Sovetov Samara players
FC Kuban Krasnodar players
Russian Premier League players
FC Khimki players
FC Mordovia Saransk players
FC Arsenal Tula players
FC Tom Tomsk players
FC Lokomotiv Moscow players
FC Rotor Volgograd players